Sorkh Cheshmeh may refer to:

Sorkh Cheshmeh, North Khorasan

See also
Cheshmeh Sorkh (disambiguation)